Józef Batory (noms de guerre "Argus", "Wojtek") was a Polish soldier and resistance fighter during World War II and after.
Batory was born on 20 February 1914 in Werynia, Poland. He fought in the 1939 Polish September Campaign, then was an active member of the anti-German resistance. In the early 1940s, he became commandant of the Kolbuszowa district of the Home Army.

From 1945 on, Batory became a leading member of the anti-Communist organization, Freedom and Independence. Apprehended by the Communist Polish secret police, the UB, some time in the late 1940s, he was executed on the evening of 1 March 1951 in the infamous Mokotów Prison in Warsaw.

The location of his grave is unknown. Batory is commemorated as one of the "Cursed soldiers" of Poland.

Sources

Notes and references 

 Polish secret police torture methods
 WiN | Freedom and Independence - A Historical Brief by Dr. Janusz Marek Kurtyka, Ph.D., Instytut Pamięci Narodowej, IPN, Poland.

1914 births
1951 deaths
People from Kolbuszowa
People from the Kingdom of Galicia and Lodomeria
Home Army officers
Cursed soldiers
People executed by the Polish People's Republic
Nonpersons in the Eastern Bloc
Executed people from Podkarpackie Voivodeship